Miloška Nott, Lady Nott, OBE (née Vlahović; 1935) is an Anglo-Slovenian charity fundraiser. 

Lady Nott set up The Fund For Refugees in Slovenia which organises humanitarian aid, schooling and homes for people who were forced to flee their homes during the Bosnian War. The charity has raised millions of pounds for good causes.

Biography 
Miloška Vlahović was born in Slovenia and her father, Lujo Vlahović, was interned in Dachau concentration camp for helping anti-Nazi partisans.

Lady Nott was appointed OBE in the Queen's Birthday Honours list (2012) for her humanitarian work. Since the early 1990s she has been organising humanitarian aid, schooling and homes for people who were forced to flee their homes during the Balkan War.

Family 
She is married to Sir John Nott who served in Margaret Thatcher's Cabinet, and who was the Patron of the Fund For Refugees charity. Their children are Julian, a film composer, screenwriter and director, best known for writing the scores for the Wallace & Gromit comedy series, William, who works for an international oil company in London, and the author, Sasha, wife of the former Conservative MP and Government minister, Hugo Swire, Baron Swire.

Sir John and Lady Nott live in London SW3.

See also
European Refugee Fund

References

External links
www.bbc.co.uk

1935 births
Living people
Miloska
Philanthropists from London
Women philanthropists
British people of Slovenian-Jewish descent
Slovenian emigrants to the United Kingdom
Slovenian Jews
Charity fundraisers (people)
Officers of the Order of the British Empire